Herne Katha is a Nepali web series, directed by Bidhya Chapagain and Kamal Kumar and produced by Tana Bana Digital. The web series shows untold stories of ordinary people in the format of short documentaries. First episode of Herne Katha was aired in March 2018.

Prior to co-founding Herne Katha, Bidhya Chapagain used to present a popular TV debate show called Sajha Sawal, produced by BBC Media Action in Nepal. Herne Katha team also produces documentary films. The Man Who Died Once, co-directed by Bidhya Chapagain and Kamal Kumar won the best documentary award in Nepal Panorama category in Kathmandu International Mountain Film Festival 2018.

Reception 
The show has been hugely popular among Nepali audiences. It has gained a lot of praises in social media. Journalist Mohan Guragain in The Kathmandu Post  stated, "Within a year of the team launching their audio-visual platform for storytelling, the channel has won hearts and set itself apart from the rest—mostly with intriguing stories of the common people’s suffering." He further adds, "Uploaded at regular intervals of two weeks, ‘Herne Katha’ videos have been a powerful journalistic tool. For one, in a country where qualified and well-paid government teachers shirk their duties, causing freefall in the quality of public school education, an episode of ‘Herne Katha’ tells the story of a teacher who volunteered at a school for years simply because he could not tolerate seeing the happy faces of his pupils overcome by gloom should he have decided to leave."

Shristi Karki in Nepali Times mentioned Herne Katha as 'The Extraordinary Lives of ordinary Nepalis". In her feature story about Herne Katha she writes further "These recent programs on Herne Katha unite Nepalis by showing us the lives of other Nepalis, providing hope and optimism at a time when most have little of both. The series that began airing in 2018 is created by ex-BBC journalists Bidhya Chapagain and Kamal Kumar who are constantly on the road to the remotest corners of Nepal to profile ordinary Nepalis living extraordinary lives. "

Episodes of Herne Katha

References

External links
 
 Herne Katha Website

Nepalese web series
Nepalese television series